Nelson Byrd Woltz Landscape Architects (NBW) is an American landscape architecture firm based in New York, Charlottesville, and Houston, founded in 1985 by Warren T. Byrd, Jr., and Susan Nelson, and led by Thomas Woltz.

History
Warren Byrd and Susan Nelson founded Nelson Byrd Landscape Architects in 1985 in Charlottesville, Virginia. Thomas Woltz became a named partner in 2004 and sole owner of the firm in 2013.

Building upon the work of Byrd, who was Woltz's mentor and professor at the University of Virginia, the firm has expanded its focus over the past ten years to include restoring damaged ecological landscapes and developing projects that combine agriculture, ecological restoration, and cultural use.

Today, NBW projects include public parks, academic institutions, botanical gardens, memorial landscapes, corporate campuses, and urban planning. The firm has worked in Mexico, Italy, the United Kingdom, the Netherlands, Canada, China, Australia, New Zealand, and the United States.

The firm guided the cultural and ecological revitalization of Memorial Park, a nearly 1,500-acre municipal park in Houston. The project incorporated the many disparate parts of the park's program while supporting its overall ecology.

At the Citygarden Sculpture Park, NBW transformed an unused plot within the 1.1-mile-long strip of open space called the Gateway Mall, located on one of downtown St. Louis’s busiest streets, into a series of meandering paths meant to evoke the nearby Mississippi River. The park features sculptural work from contemporary and modern artists. The park, which opened in July 2009 to coincide with the Major League Baseball’s All-Star Game to be held in the city that year, was conceived to be a “sculpture garden, urban park, and urban garden” that took advantage of the existing change in elevation of the terrain to create distinct areas or bands containing trees, gardens, support and maintenance buildings, lawns, and water areas, with sculptures sited throughout.

Another significant project is the Hudson Yards Plaza at the Hudson Yards development in New York City. Located within the largest private development in United States history, the plaza is formed by a series of elliptical forms that give shape to landscaped spaces. The attached  public square has 28,000 plants and 225 trees, located on the platform upon which Hudson Yards is built, which is itself located on top of an active train yard.

The plaza's southern side includes a canopy of trees, while the southeast entrance also contains a fountain. A "'seasonally expressive' entry garden" stands outside the entrance to the New York City Subway's 34th Street–Hudson Yards station. The plaza also connects to the High Line, an elevated promenade at its south end.

Notable Projects
 Rothko Chapel Master Plan, Houston, Texas
 Mt. Cuba Center, Hockessin, Delaware
 Aga Khan Garden at the University of Alberta Botanic Garden, Edmonton, Alberta, Canada
 Memorial Park, Houston, Texas
 Cornwall Park Master Plan, Auckland, New Zealand
 Centennial Park, Nashville, Tennessee
 The Hudson Yards Plaza, New York City, New York
 Citygarden, St. Louis, Missouri
 Flight 93 National Memorial, Shanksville, Pennsylvania
 Sylvester Manor Educational Farm, Shelter Island, Suffolk County, New York
Peabody Essex Museum, Salem, Massachusetts
 Olana Strategic Landscape Initiatives and Farm Complex Restoration, Greenport, Columbia County, New York
 Historic Jay Gardens at the Jay Estate Rye, New York
 Peggy Guggenheim Collection Gardens, Venice, Italy
 Monticello Stewardship Master Plan, Charlottesville, Virginia
 The Georgia Institute of Technology Eco Commons, Atlanta, Georgia
 Eastwoodhill Arboretum, Ngatapa, Gisborne, New Zealand
 WaterColor, Gulf Coast, Florida
 Sunnyside Yard, Sunnyside, Queens, New York City, New York

Awards
The American Society of Landscape Architects has recognized the firm's work numerous times over the last two decades, including in recent years Honor Awards for the Olana Strategic Landscape Design Plan (2017), Cornwall Park Park 100 Year Master Plan (2015), the Overlook Farm Master Plan (2015), Carnegie Hill House (2011), Citygarden (2011), and the California Institute of Technology Master Plan with architecture firm Cooper, Robertson & Partners (2010).

The firm's monograph, Nelson Byrd Woltz: Garden, Park, Community, Farm, published by Princeton Architectural Press, received an ASLA Honor Award in 2014.

In 2011, the Urban Land Institute presented the firm with the Amanda Burden Urban Open Space Award for the Citygarden project in St. Louis. The firm has also received awards from Architizer, the AIA Committee on the Environment, the New Zealand Institute of Landscape Architects, and the National Park Service.

See also
 Landscape Architecture
 Hudson Yards
 Olana State Historic Site
 Citygarden
 Memorial Park

References

External links
 

Architecture firms based in New York City
Architecture firms based in Virginia
Landscape architecture organizations
Architecture firms based in Texas
Design companies established in 1986